The Saad Zaghloul Mausoleum was built in 1927 to commemorate the late Egyptian revolutionary, Saad Zaghloul. It is located in Downtown Cairo, Egypt.

Overview
Built of granite, the mausoleum's design echoes that of pharaonic temples, with Arabic calligraphic engraving, with an outward-curving cornice and entrance flanked by two great lotus pillars. The mausoleum is built near Zaghloul's house, which is known as Beit El-Umma or the "House of the Nation". It is nowadays used as a museum in Zaghloul's memory, with his furniture and clothes stored inside.

See also
Emir Qurqumas Complex

Mausoleums in Egypt
Buildings and structures in Cairo
Buildings and structures completed in 1927
20th-century architecture in Egypt